MXM may refer to:

 Mobile PCI Express Module (MXM, created 2011), a computing hardware standard
 Master X Master (MXM, released 2017), a video game
 MPEG eXtensible Middleware (MXM, released 2013), a video standard by the Moving Picture Experts Group
 Methoxmetamine (MXM et al), a dissociative drug
 MXM (musical duo) (2017–2018), a South Korean duo under Brand New Music
mxmtoon (b. 2000), American singer-songwriter and internet personality